Enders is an unincorporated community located in Jackson Township, Dauphin County, Pennsylvania, United States, just north of Harrisburg. The town lies in the Eastern Standard time zone and has an elevation of 669 feet. Although it has an official federally recognized name, it is considered to be not incorporated.

Originally called Jacksonville, Enders was laid out circa 1825.

References

Unincorporated communities in Pennsylvania
Unincorporated communities in Dauphin County, Pennsylvania
Harrisburg–Carlisle metropolitan statistical area